Hira Chandra KC (born 21 December 1975) is a Nepali politician, who is currently the State Minister of Health and Population in the ruling coalition led by Prime Minister and Nepali Congress President Sher Bahadur Deuba.

He is a member of the newly formed CPN (Unified Socialist). KC was elected as a Member of Parliament (MP) in the House of Representatives from Dang 3 (constituency) in the 2017 General Election. He was elected representing CPN UML of the left alliance, defeating his closest rival Dipak Giri of Nepali Congress. He secured 40,287 votes to Giri's 33,730.

References

Living people
Communist Party of Nepal (Unified Socialist) politicians
Nepal MPs 2017–2022
Nepal Communist Party (NCP) politicians
Communist Party of Nepal (Unified Marxist–Leninist) politicians
1975 births